Rainbow USA Inc. (commonly referred to as Rainbow Shops or simply Rainbow) is a privately held, moderately priced American retail apparel chain comprising several lifestyle brands primarily targeting teenagers and young women. The company is headquartered in the East New York section of Brooklyn, New York, United States.

History
Rainbow Shops was founded in 1935 in New York City by Irving Arthur Swarzman, an Austrian native who was raised in Brooklyn. Swarzman brought his four brothers (Herman, Oscar, Ira, and Nat) into the business as they reached working age. They built the business from one shop to a high of eighty-two stores before selling the business in the 1980s, according to Mr. Swarzman's granddaughter. Rainbow Shops is now owned by the Syrian-Jewish Chehebar family. Today, along with sister brands 5-7-9 and Marianne, Rainbow operates 1,300 stores in United States, Puerto Rico, and the U.S. Virgin Islands.

Rainbow's holding company, A.I.J.J. Enterprises Inc., purchased the 5-7-9 brand in 1999 from the bankrupt Edison Brothers Stores. It's operated through a company division named The New 5-7-9 and Beyond, Inc.

Rainbow stores are an average of 5,000 square ft. Each store’s merchandise varies by location, depending upon demographics and the size of the location. Larger stores usually carry juniors, plus, lingerie, shoes and kids departments.

E-commerce
In November 2012, Rainbow launched its online store which offers a cultivated selection of Junior and Plus fashion, shoes, accessories, discounts, offers and promotions. Its online assortment of styles gets updated daily.

References

External links
www.rainbowshops.com
www.mariannestores.com
www.579.com

American companies established in 1935
Retail companies established in 1935
1935 establishments in New York City
Retail companies based in New York City